Jared Page (born 22 July 1993 in New Zealand) is a New Zealand rugby union player who plays for the  in Super Rugby. His playing position is fullback. He has signed for the Blues squad in 2020.

Reference list

External links
itsrugby.co.uk profile

1993 births
New Zealand rugby union players
Living people
Rugby union fullbacks
Rugby union centres
Rugby union wings
Counties Manukau rugby union players
North Harbour rugby union players
Blues (Super Rugby) players